Prescot Town Council is the town council for the town and civil parish of Prescot in Knowsley, Merseyside, England. The Town Council has existed in its current form since the Local Elections of May 1983.

Wards and Councillors

References

Parish councils of England
Local precepting authorities in England
Local authorities in Merseyside
Local government in the Metropolitan Borough of Knowsley